Jehoshaphat, son of Asa, was the fourth king of Judah according to 1 Kings 15:24 in the Hebrew Bible.

Jehoshaphat may also refer to:  
Jehoshaphat the Recorder, son of Ahilud, a scribe who appears in 2 Samuel 8:16 and 2 Samuel 20:24.
Jehoshaphat, son of Paruah, Solomon's administrator in Issachar, who appears in 1 Kings 4:17
Jehoshaphat (high priest), High Priest of Israel
Valley of Josaphat,  a Biblical place 
Jehoshaphat ben Saul, 9th century religious figure
Jehoshaphat (father of Jehu), the father of King Jehu of Israel, the son of Nimshi and the grandson of Omri.
Boaz ben Jehoshaphat, his son

See also

Josaphat (disambiguation)